Women of All Red Nations (WARN) was a Native American women's organization. It was established in 1974 by Lorelei DeCora Means, Madonna Thunderhawk, Phyllis Young, Janet McCloud, Marie Sanchez and others. WARN included more than 300 women from 30 different tribal communities. Many of its members had previously been active in the American Indian Movement and were participants in the 1973 Wounded Knee incident. The inaugural conference took place in Rapid City, South Dakota.

WARN championed the health of Native American women, the restoration and securing of treaty rights, eliminating Indian mascots for sports teams, and combating the commercialization of Indian culture. They highlighted the high rates of health issues caused by nuclear mining and storage on Indian land, such as birth defects, miscarriages and deaths. They also expressed concerns about forced sterilization of Indian women and the adoption of Indian children by non-Indians. They published the article "The Theft of Life" in their annual newsletter to draw attention to the ongoing forced sterilization of Indigenous women. This article was reprinted for the National Indian Civil Rights Issues hearing, part of the United States Commission on Civil Rights, held in Washington, D.C., in 1979. 

A 1974 WARN study reported that, during the 1970s, 40–50% of interviewed indigenous women believed they had been sterilized, although a subsequent study indicated this estimate was too high. Estimating the prevalence of sterilization is difficult, as the population did undergo growth during this period, while many of those who underwent the procedure already had three or four children. As a result of the efforts of WARN to bring attention to these practices, in 1979 regulations governing sterilization were issued by the United States Department of Health and Human Services. In 1980, WARN issued a report indicating a statistical correlation between the high levels of pollution on Pine Ridge Reservation and an increased incidence of birth defects, abortions and cancer. This region had been used for uranium mining, served as a military gunnery range and had been subjected to herbicide and insecticide contamination from off-reservation farms.

History of the group
Information varies on whether WARN was founded in 1974 in Rapid City, South Dakota or founded in 1978. Prior to forming their own organization, some of the women who founded WARN were activists working within the American Indian Movement (AIM) and were active in the Wounded Knee Insurrection of 1973. Madonna Thunderhawk and Lorelei DeCora Means were both part of the Pig Patrol in AIM during the occupation of Wounded Knee.  Two other co-founders, Janet McCloud and Phyllis Young, had also taken part in other Red Power movement activism.

The group was formed as a result both of mounting frustration with a lack of visibility, and because of the persecution of the male leaders of AIM. The federal government made arrests of many of the male activists but did not arrest the female activists. The prolonged incarceration or trials for male leaders necessitated women to fill in leadership roles. The women formed WARN in order in response to this lack of attention towards them, and to continue to campaign for Indigenous rights. The formation of WARN also provided indigenous women with the opportunity to focus on issues that affected them as women specifically.

Uranium mining
In 1980 WARN conducted and published a study on the effects of radiation contamination in water from uranium mining on human reproductive health titled "Radiation: Dangerous to Pine Ridge Women" in the journal Akwesane News. J. Haworth Jonte was the biochemist that measured radiation levels within the Pine Ridge Indian Reservation water sources. The federal guidelines indicated that any measurement over 5 picocuries of radiation per liter of water was a severe health hazard. The surface water measurement was 15 picocuries per liter. The reservation's aquifer had a measurement of 11 picocuries per liter. 

A new well was proposed to solve water contamination issue. The study also tested water at the site of the new well and found that water to be fourteen times higher than the federal guidelines.

WARN conducted a community survey in the Pine Ridge Indian Reservation in South Dakota, close to the border of Nebraska. The survey found an abnormally high rate of miscarriages, leukemia, and cancer mortality in the population of the reservation and surrounding areas. Other adverse health effects were also found in the area: 60 to 70 percent of children who were born in the Pine Ridge Hospital suffered respiratory problems as a result of underdeveloped lungs or jaundice. Thirty-eight percent of pregnant women admitted to the Public Service Hospital had miscarriages and many of these women experienced excessive bleeding after miscarrying. Cattle living on the reservation also saw an increase in birth defects. These negative health effects were linked to the effects of radiation from uranium mining. The radiation from mining in the Black Hills in South Dakota and Edgemont contaminated the Cheyenne River, a source for the Lakota Aquifer. WARN called for a complete Congressional investigation of the health and water situation in the Pine Ridge Reservation.

Sterilization of Native American women

WARN linked the issue of coerced sterilization to a continuing attack on the Indigenous population in order to acquire their land for resources such as uranium.

Connie Pinkerton-Uri, a physician of Choctaw and Cherokee heritage, carried out a survey in 1974 of Native American women. Pinkerton-Uri’s goal was to collect data on rates of sterilization among Native American women of various tribal backgrounds. Her findings were published by the University of Nebraska Press. This study found that many of the Native American women who had been sterilized underwent the procedure without their informed consent.

Many of the women did not understand what they were agreeing to, or were coerced or threatened into agreement, or were not in the proper mental state to give consent when asked to sign sterilization forms by medical professionals. Some of the women interviewed were asked about sterilization during labor, or while under the influence of pain relieving drugs. Other women were presented with sterilization paperwork in English that they could not read. Still others were told that if they did not sign the sterilization forms that they would lose government benefits that they depended on or that their children would be taken from them. In some cases the women were falsely told the procedure could be reversed at a later time if they wanted to have children.

Pinkerton-Uri stated that many of the doctors performing the sterilizations believed that if Native Americans could not have children or had fewer children that they would become less financially impoverished. In her research Pinkerton-Uri found that twenty-five percent of full-blooded Native American women had been sterilized.

In 1976 the U.S. General Accounting Office found that from 1973-1976, 3,406 Native American women underwent coerced sterilization procedures in just four of the twelve IHS service areas. Out of these 3,406 women, 36 of them were under the age of 21. These 36 young women were sterilized in direct violation of a court order stating that minimum age for sterilization procedures to be 21. The total number of coerced sterilizations during this period across all twelve IHS service areas was estimated to be roughly 3,000 per year.

Adding to the problems of sterilization of women of color are aspects of victim blaming. According to a 1979 meeting in Akwesasne, this victim blaming takes the form of tribes with high levels of sterilization being viewed as incompetent of defending their inhabitants, by tribes that have not experienced high levels of sterilization.

See also
 Eugenics in the United States

References

Native American women's organizations
Native American rights organizations
Native American feminism
American Indian Movement
Organizations established in 1974
1974 establishments in South Dakota